Sinde may refer to:

People
 Ángeles González-Sinde, a Spanish scriptwriter, film director and politician

Places
 Sinde (ward), an administrative ward in the Mbeya Urban district of the Mbeya Region, Tanzania
 Sinde (Tábua), a civil parish in the municipality of Tábua, Portugal